The Bratu-220 was a Franco-Romanian prototype three-engined airliner of the 1930s, built in France.

Development and usage

The aircraft was designed in 1929 by a Romanian engineer Romulus Bratu, who worked in France. Quite unusual was its arrangement, with one engine in a fuselage front, and the other two in a common nacelle over a wing, in a push-pull configuration. A model was tested in a laboratory of St. Cyr Aeronautical Institute. Parts of the plane were made in a factory at Athis-Mons, and assembled in the CIDNA workshops at Le Bourget airport.

The prototype was flown on 26 November 1932 and after tests, received a French airworthiness certificate. The plane had high useful load 4500 kg and could fly on two engines. In March 1933 it was shown to the French Minister of Air Pierre Cot.

Description 
High-wing cantilever monoplane of wooden construction, with closed cab, three engines, and a fixed landing gear. Sparless wing, with slightly swept leading edge, straight rear edge and rounded tips, was basing on a geodetical structure of crossing ribs. Crew sat in a cab before the wing. Next and below in the fuselage, under the wing, there was a cabin for 10 passengers, with rectangular windows and access doors in front and at the rear. The landing-gear was of the conventional-type, with a tailwheel.

A single Gnome-Rhône Jupiter 420 hp radial engine was mounted in the nose of the fuselage, while two Gnome-Rhône Titan 230 hp radial engines were in a common nacelle on struts above the fuselage and wing, one of them was tractor, the other one pusher (push-pull configuration). All engines drove two-blade propellers and had no covers.

Specifications

See also

References

Bibliography

External links

Photos and drawings at Ugolok Neba site

Aircraft manufactured in France
1930s French airliners
Three-engined push-pull aircraft
High-wing aircraft
CIDNA aircraft
Aircraft first flown in 1932